Franklin Township, Arkansas may refer to:

 Franklin Township, Calhoun County, Arkansas
 Franklin Township, Carroll County, Arkansas
 Franklin Township, Desha County, Arkansas
 Franklin Township, Drew County, Arkansas
 Franklin Township, Grant County, Arkansas
 Franklin Township, Howard County, Arkansas
 Franklin Township, Izard County, Arkansas
 Franklin Township, Little River County, Arkansas
 Franklin Township, Marion County, Arkansas
 Franklin Township, Stone County, Arkansas
 Franklin Township, Union County, Arkansas

See also 
 List of townships in Arkansas
 Franklin Township (disambiguation)

Arkansas township disambiguation pages